The Cook County Assessor is the assessor and county government officer of Cook County, Illinois.

Office description
Before the creation of the position of Cook County Assessor in 1932, the Cook County Board of Assessors completed assessments in Cook County. The Board of Assessors had been created after a law passed by the Illinois General Assembly on February 25, 1898 created a Board of Assessors in counties with 125,000 or more inhabitants. The board had five members, with a rule that no more than four could reside in the same city.

After an apparent fourteen month delay in determining the 1931 assessment, it was decided that the structure of assessment in Cook County, with a five member Board of Assessors and three member Cook County Board of Review needed to be restructured. 

On February 13, 1932, the Illinois General Assembly passed a law that in counties of 250,000 or more, the governor and the presidents of those counties' board of commissioners would appoint an Assessor to hold office until either the first Monday in December 1932, or until a successor could otherwise be elected.

The first election for the office of Cook County Assessor took place in November 1934 for a four-year term. The Board of Assessors was disestablished once the new assessor took office.

Officeholders

Recent election results

|-
| colspan=16 style="text-align:center;" |Cook County Assessor general elections
|-
!Year
!Winning candidate
!Party
!Vote (pct)
!Opponent
!Party
! Vote (pct)
!Opponent
!Party
! Vote (pct)
!Opponent
!Party
! Vote (pct)
|-
|1986
| | Thomas C. Hynes
| | Democratic
| | 969,500 (357,758%)
| | Le Roy M. Graham
| | Republican
| | 357,758	(26.95%)
| 
| 
| 
| 
| 
| 
|-
|1990
| | Thomas C. Hynes
| | Democratic
| | 775,493 (62.05%)
| | Ronald Bean
| | Republican
| | 333,325	(26.67%)
|Text style="background:#D2B48C | Donald Pamon
|Text style="background:#D2B48C | Harold Washington Party
|Text style="background:#D2B48C | 141,015 (11.28%)
| 
| 
| 
|-
|1994
| | Thomas C. Hynes
| | Democratic
| | 
| | Sandra C. Wilson-Muriel
| | Republican
| | 
|Text style="background:#D2B48C |  Donald Pamon
|Text style="background:#D2B48C | Harold Washington Party
|Text style="background:#D2B48C | 
| Loretha Weisinger
| Populist
| 
|-
|1998
| | James Houlihan
| | Democratic
| | 926,646 (75.58%)
| | Jose Carlos Gomez
| | Republican
| | 260,245 (21.23%)
| Philip Morris
| Justice Party
| 39,111 (3.19%)
|
| 
| 
|-
|2002
| | James Houlihan
| | Democratic
| | 954,774 (75.78%)
| | James P. Pieczonka
| | Republican
| | 305,176 (24.22%)
| 
| 
| 
| 
| 
| 
|-
|2006
| | James Houlihan
| | Democratic
| | 1,010,400 (80.41%)
| | Ralph Conner
| | Republican
| | 246,186 (19.59%) 
| 
| 
| 
| 
| 
| 
|-
|2010
| | Joseph Berrios
| | Democratic
| | 648,053 (48.03%)
| | Forrest Claypool
| | Independent
| | 427,842 (31.71%)
| | Sharon Strobeck-Eckersall
| | Republican
| | 237,955 (17.64%) 
| 
| 
| 
|-
|2014
| | Joseph Berrios
| | Democratic
| | 960,435 (100%)
| 
| 
| 
| 
| 
| 
| 
| 
| 
|-
|2018
| | Fritz Kaegi
| | Democratic
| | 1,272,651 (76.19%)
| | Joseph Paglia
| | Republican
| | 397,741 (23.81%)
| 
| 
| 
| 
| 
| 
|-
|2022
| |Fritz Kaegi
| | Democratic
| |1,063,188 (82.31%)
| | Nico Tsatsoulis
| | Libertarian
| |228,425 (17.69%)
| 
| 
|
| 
| 
|

References

 
1932 establishments in Illinois